The 1992 500 km of Monza was the opening race of the FIA Sportscar World Championship.  It was run on April 26, 1992 at Monza, and was won by Geoff Lees and Hitoshi Ogawa driving a Toyota TS010.

Official results

Class winners in bold.  Cars failing to complete 90% of winner's distance marked as Not Classified (NC).

Statistics
 Pole Position - #1 Peugeot Talbot Sport - 1:26.019
 Fastest Lap - #2 Peugeot Talbot Sport - 1:29.386
 Average Speed - 221.411 km/h

External links
 Official Results

500km Of Monza, 1992
6 Hours of Monza
Monza